Vernon Lewis Quinsey (born October 10, 1944) is a Canadian psychologist. He has studied violent crime offenders, sex offenders, sexually violent predators, juvenile delinquency, and ways to predict, assess, and manage individuals with these tendencies. He testified in court that a rapist, Allen Edward Bullock, was "erotically attracted to that kind of behavior".

Life and career
Quinsey  was born in Flin Flon, Manitoba. He earned a bachelor's degree from University of North Dakota in 1966. He then entered the e Biopsychology Program University of Massachusetts at Amherst, earning a master's degree in 1969 and a Ph.D. in 1970. He taught at Smith College while completing his graduate studies. In 1970 and 1971, Quinsey did postdoctoral work at Dalhousie University.

He was appointed to the staff of Penetanguishene Mental Health Centre in 1971 and was appointed Director of research in 1976. In 1984 he spent two years as a visiting scientist at the Institut Philippe-Pinel de Montréal and adjunct associate professor at Concordia University. In 1986 he was appointed Associate Professor in the Psychiatry Department at University of Toronto. He was then appointed Professor and Queen's National Scholar in the Psychology Department at Queen's University in 1988, where he held cross positions in the Division of Forensic/Correctional Psychiatry and Biology. In 2009 he was appointed Professor Emeritus of Psychology, Biology, & Psychiatry.

In 2008, Quinsey was awarded the Canadian Psychological Association's Donald O. Hebb Award for Distinguished Contributions to Psychology as a Science.

His work has attempted to predict criminal recidivism using actuarial techniques.

Selected publications
<div class="small">
Books
Griffiths D, Quinsey VL, Hingsburger D (1989). Changing Inappropriate Sexual Behavior: A Community Based Approach for Persons with Developmental Disabilities. Brookes Publishing, 
Rice ME, Harris GT, Varney GW, Quinsey VL (1989). Violence in Institutions: Understanding, Prevention, and Control. Hogrefe and Huber, 
Webster CD, Harris GT, Rice ME, Cormier C, Quinsey VL (1994). The Violence Prediction Scheme: Assessing Dangerousness in High Risk Men. Centre of Criminology, University of Toronto. 
Zamble E, Quinsey VL (1997). The Criminal Recidivism Process. Cambridge University Press, 
Quinsey VL, Lalumière M (2001). Assessment of Sexual Offenders Against Children, Second Edition. SAGE Publications, 
Quinsey VL, Skilling TA, Lalumière ML, Craig W (2004). Juvenile Delinquency: Understanding the Origins of Individual Differences. American Psychological Association, 
Lalumière ML, Harris GT, Quinsey VL, Rice ME (2005). The Causes of Rape: Understanding Individual Differences in the Male Propensity for Sexual Aggression. American Psychological Association, 
Quinsey VL, Harris GT, Rice ME, Cormier C (2006). Violent Offenders: Appraising and Managing Risk, Second Edition. American Psychological Association, 

Papers and chapters
Harris GT, Rice ME, Quinsey VL, Lalumière ML, Boer D, Lang, C (2003). A multisite comparison of actuarial risk instruments for sex offenders. Psychological Assessment, Vol 15(3), Sep 2003, 413–425. doi: 10.1037/1040-3590.15.3.413 
Hanson RK, Gordon A, Harris AJR, Marques JK, Murphy W, Quinsey VL, Seto MC (2002). First report of the collaborative outcome data project on the effectiveness of psychological treatment for sex offenders. Sexual Abuse: A Journal of Research and Treatment, April 2002, Volume 14, Issue 2, pp 169–194, 
Book AS, Starzyk KB, Quinsey VL (2001). The relationship between testosterone and aggression: A meta-analysis. Aggression and Violent Behavior, Volume 6, Issue 6, November–December 2001, Pages 579–599. 10.1016/S1359-1789(00)00032-X
Lieb R, Quinsey VL, Berliner L (1998). Sexual predators and social policy. Crime and Justice, Vol. 23, (1998), pp. 43–114
Harris GT, Rice ME, Quinsey VL, Chaplin TC (1998). Viewing time as a measure of sexual interest among child molesters and normal heterosexual men. Behaviour Research and Therapy, Volume 34, Issue 4, April 1996, Pages 389–394, 
Quinsey VL, Khanna, A, Malcolm PB (1998). A retrospective evaluation of the Regional Treatment Centre sex offender treatment program. Journal of Interpersonal Violence, October 1998 vol. 13 no. 5 621-644 doi: 10.1177/088626098013005005
Harris GT, Rice ME, Quinsey VL (1998). Appraisal and management of risk in sexual aggressors: Implications for criminal justice policy. Psychology, Public Policy, and Law, Vol 4(1-2), Mar-Jun 1998, 73-115. doi: 10.1037/1076-8971.4.1-2.73
Lalumière ML, Quinsey VL (1996). Sexual deviance, antisociality, mating effort, and the use of sexually coercive behaviors. Personality and Individual Differences, Volume 21, Issue 1, July 1996, Pages 33–48 doi:10.1016/0191-8869(96)00059-1
Landolt MA, Lalumière ML, Quinsey VL (1995). Sex differences in intra-sex variations in human mating tactics: An evolutionary approach. Ethology and Sociobiology, Volume 16, Issue 1, January 1995, Pages 3–23 10.1016/0162-3095(94)00012-V
Quinsey VL, Rice ME, Harris GT (1995). Actuarial prediction of sexual recidivism. Journal of Interpersonal Violence, March 1995 vol. 10 no. 1 85-105 doi: 10.1177/088626095010001006
Harris GT, Rice ME, Quinsey VL (1994). Psychopathy as a taxon: evidence that psychopaths are a discrete class. Journal of Consulting and Clinical Psychology, Vol 62(2), Apr 1994, 387–397. doi: 10.1037/0022-006X.62.2.387 
Lalumière ML, Quinsey VL (1994). The Discriminability of Rapists from Non-Sex Offenders Using Phallometric Measures A Meta-Analysis. Criminal Justice and Behavior, 21(1), 150–175. The discriminability of rapists from non-sex offenders using phallometric measures: a meta-Analysis. Criminal Justice and Behavior, 21.1 (1994): 150–175.
Harris GT, Rice ME, Quinsey VL, Chaplin TC, Earls C (1992). Maximizing the discriminant validity of phallometric assessment data. Psychological Assessment, Vol 4(4), Dec 1992, 502–511. doi: 10.1037/1040-3590.4.4.502 DOI:01/1992; 4:502-511.
Rice ME, Quinsey VL, Harris GT (1991). Sexual recidivism among child molesters released from a maximum security psychiatric institution. Journal of Consulting and Clinical Psychology, Vol 59(3), Jun 1991, 381–386. doi: 10.1037/0022-006X.59.3.381 
Quinsey VL, Earls CM (1990). The modification of sexual preferences. in Handbook of sexual assault: Issues, theories, and treatment of the offender. Applied clinical psychology, (pp. 279–295). Plenum Press, 
Rice ME, Harris GT, Quinsey VL, (1990). A follow-up of rapists assessed in a maximum-security psychiatric facility.' Journal of Interpersonal Violence, December 1990 vol. 5 no. 4 435-448 doi: 10.1177/088626090005004001
Quinsey VL, Chaplin TC, Upfold D (1984). Sexual arousal to nonsexual violence and sadomasochistic themes among rapists and non-sex-offenders. Journal of Consulting and Clinical Psychology, Vol 52(4), Aug 1984, 651-657. doi: 10.1037/0022-006X.52.4.651 
Quinsey VL (1977). The assessment and treatment of child molesters: A review. Canadian Psychological Review/Psychologie canadienne, Vol 18(3), Jul 1977, 204–220. doi: 10.1037/h0081436
Quinsey VL, Chaplin TC, Varney G (1981). A comparison of rapists' and non-sex offenders' sexual preferences for mutually consenting sex, rape, and physical abuse of women. Behavioral Assessment, 3, 127–135.
Quinsey VL, Chaplin TC, Carrigan WF (1979). Sexual preferences among incestuous and nonincestuous child molesters. Behavior Therapy, Volume 10, Issue 4, September 1979, Pages 562–565 doi:10.1016/S0005-7894(79)80057-X
Quinsey VL, Steinman CM, Bergersen SG, Holmes TF (1975). Penile circumference, skin conductance, and ranking responses of child molesters and “normals” to sexual and nonsexual visual stimuli. Behavior Therapy'', Volume 6, Issue 2, March 1975, Pages 213–219 doi:10.1016/S0005-7894(75)80143-2,
</div class="small">

References

External links
Vernon Quinsey via Queen's University
Testimony by Quinsey for the Standing Committee on Justice and Human Rights, via Parliament of Canada

Living people
1944 births
Canadian psychologists
University of North Dakota alumni
University of Massachusetts Amherst alumni
Academic staff of Queen's University at Kingston